Yao'an County (Chuxiong Yi script: ,) is under the administration of the Chuxiong Yi Autonomous Prefecture, in the west-central part of Yunnan province, China. A prominent Chinese philosopher Li Zhi used to a prefect of Yao'an county and his governance here was warmly welcomed by local people. In 2009, an earthquake took place in Yao'an.

Administrative divisions
Yao'an County has 6 towns and 3 townships. 
6 towns

3 townships
 Shizhong
 Zuomen
 Dahekou

Climate

References

External links
Yaoan County Official Website

County-level divisions of Chuxiong Prefecture